Moses Franklin Rittenhouse (12 August 1846 – 7 November 1915) was a Canadian-American businessman and philanthropist who made his fortune in the lumber business in Chicago after moving there in 1864.

Biography
Moses F. Rittenhouse was born in Vineland, Ontario on 12 August 1846. He moved to Chicago in 1864, and entered the lumber business.

He married Emma Stover on 17 December 1871, and they had three children.

He died from heart failure in Chicago on 7 November 1915.

Philanthropy
Rittenhouse's success in business allowed him to bestow upon his fellow citizens many other generous gifts which include a school, a recreation hall, and the resources necessary to create a library in Lincoln.  Today, the Vineland branch of the Lincoln Public Library is named in his honour to reflect his long association with the library in Lincoln.

Agriculture
He helped to establish the Vineland Research Station for research on growing tender fruit.  His donation of land resulted in decades of useful horticultural research that has benefited many in and around the Niagara Peninsula.

Continuing the proud association Rittenhouse had established with the local fruit industry, his nephew, Moses K. Rittenhouse began building orchard sprayers from his barn in Jordan Station, soon after in 1914 establishing the company M. K. Rittenhouse.  Today, Rittenhouse still provides spraying equipment and agricultural tools to local farmers, and there is scarcely a farm in the Niagara Region that does not, or has not in the past used a Rittenhouse sprayer.

References

External links
 Rittenhouse
 

1846 births
1915 deaths
People from the Regional Municipality of Niagara
American people of Canadian descent
Canadian businesspeople

19th-century American businesspeople